Saario is a Finnish surname. Notable people:

 Antti Sakari Saario (born 1974), Finnish composer and academic
 Esa Saario (born 1931), Finnish actor
 Martti Saario (1906-1988), Finnish organizational theorist and Professor of Accounting
 Tiina Saario (born 1982), Finnish football midfielder

Finnish-language surnames